A grind rail is an object used by skateboarders to do skateboarding tricks on such as grinds and slides.  It is usually square or round.

There are two types of rails:
 Handrail, a normal handrail on the sides (or the middle) of a stair
 Flatbar, a rail that is not kinked and is on the ground, not on any stairs or ramps 

It is also commonly used in freestyle skiing, skiers perform tricks off and onto a rail and also while grinding it. Rails can be all different shapes and sizes, usually ending with a small to medium drop to the landing.

See also
Skateboarding trick

References 

Skateboarding equipment